This is a round-up of the 1982 Sligo Senior Football Championship. Tourlestrane were crowned champions in this year, after defeating St. Patrick's in what was regarded as a hugely entertaining final. Tourlestrane had scuppered St. Mary's hopes of a fourth successive title at the semi-final stage.

Quarter finals

Semi-finals

Sligo Senior Football Championship Final

References

 Sligo Champion (August–September 1982)

Sligo Senior Football Championship
Sligo Senior Football Championship